Lee Robinson (born April 23, 1987) is a former American football linebacker. He most recently played for the Miami Dolphins. He was signed by the Denver Broncos as an undrafted free agent in 2009. He played college football at Alcorn State.

Robinson was also a member of the Arizona Cardinals and Tampa Bay Buccaneers.

After a career in football he started working for Transocean as a rstb moved up to a roughneck.

College career
A two-star prospect out of Amite County High School, Robinson chose Alcorn State over Louisiana-Monroe.

Professional career

Denver Broncos
Robinson went undrafted in the 2009 NFL Draft but was later signed by the Denver Broncos on April 26, 2009. He was waived on September 4, 2009.

Arizona Cardinals
Robinson was signed to the Arizona Cardinals practice squad on September 6, 2009. He was released on October 21.

Tampa Bay Buccaneers
Robinson was signed to the Tampa Bay Buccaneers practice squad on October 27. After his contract expired following the season, the Buccaneers re-signed Robinson on January 5, 2010.

He was waived on September 4, 2010, during final cuts but was re-signed to the practice squad the following day. Robinson was released from the practice squad on September 17.

Return to Denver Broncos
Robinson was signed back by the Denver Broncos to the practice squad. He was promoted to the roster on December 7, but was placed on injured reserves on December 29.

Edmonton Eskimos
In 2011, Robinson signed with the Edmonton Eskimos of the Canadian Football League. In the two seasons he played for the Eskimos, he recorded a total of six tackles and two sacks.

Miami Dolphins
On February 14, 2013, Robinson was signed by the Miami Dolphins. Miami released him on September 1, prior to the start of the regular season.

References

External links
Edmonton Eskimos player bio
Alcorn State Braves bio
Tampa Bay Buccaneers bio

1987 births
Living people
Alcorn State Braves football players
American football linebackers
Arizona Cardinals players
Denver Broncos players
Edmonton Elks players
People from Gloster, Mississippi
Players of American football from Mississippi
Tampa Bay Buccaneers players